Philip Edward Morrell (4 June 1870 – 5 January 1943) was a British Liberal politician.

Background
Morrell was the son of Frederic Morrell, a solicitor of Black Hall, Oxford, by his wife Harriette Anne, daughter of the President of St John's College, Oxford, and Vice-Chancellor of the University of Oxford, the Rev. Philip Wynter DD. The Morrell family had made its fortune as brewers of beer, and Philip Morrell's grandfather was a trustee of the family brewery. He was educated at Eton and Balliol College, Oxford.

Political career
He was adopted as the Liberal candidate for Henley in September 1902, on the advice of H. H. Asquith, and was elected as such in the following election in 1906. He served in that constituency to 1910 and in Burnley from 1910 to 1918. He was the only non-Conservative MP for Henley.

Personal life
Morrell married in London on 8 February 1902 Lady Ottoline Cavendish-Bentinck, half-sister of the 6th Duke of Portland. Lady Ottoline became an influential society hostess. They shared what would now be known as an open marriage for the rest of their lives.

His extramarital affairs produced several children who were cared for by his wife, who also struggled to conceal evidence of his mental instability. With Alice Louisa Jones, who worked at The Nation, Morrell had a son, Philip Hugh-Jones. The Morrells themselves had two children (twins): a son, Hugh, who died in infancy; and a daughter, Julian Morrell (1906–1983), whose first marriage was to Victor Goodman and second marriage was to Igor Vinogradoff.

See also
List of Bloomsbury Group people

References

External links 
 

1870 births
1943 deaths
Liberal Party (UK) MPs for English constituencies
UK MPs 1906–1910
UK MPs 1910–1918
People educated at Eton College
Alumni of Balliol College, Oxford
British pacifists
Politics of Burnley